Vintage Crime is an EP by Cobra Verde, released on November 15, 1995, through Scat Records.

Track listing

Personnel 
Cobra Verde
Don Depew – bass guitar, acoustic guitar, vocals, engineering
Doug Gillard – guitar, acoustic guitar, vocals
John Petkovic – vocals, guitar, synthesizer
Dave Swanson – drums, percussion, guitar
Production and additional personnel
Chris Brokaw – guitar on "Fire of Love"
Cobra Verde – production, design
Robert Griffin – design

References

External links 
 

1995 EPs
Cobra Verde (band) albums